James Johnson (born September 6, 1984 in New Orleans, Louisiana) is a former American football running back. He was signed by the Cincinnati Bengals as an undrafted free agent in 2008. He played college football at Kansas State.

Johnson was also a member of the Minnesota Vikings, Green Bay Packers and Pittsburgh Steelers.

Professional career

First stint with Bengals
Johnson was promoted from the Cincinnati Bengals practice squad late in the 2008 season. He saw action in the last two games of the season, carrying the ball nine times for 29 yards.  He also caught six passes for 47 yards.

He spent the 2009 season on the practice squad.

Minnesota Vikings
On January 22, 2010, Johnson signed a future contract with the Minnesota Vikings after his practice squad contract expired at season's end. He was waived on June 14.

Second stint with Bengals
On Tuesday August 10, 2010, he was again signed by the Cincinnati Bengals in the wake of injuries to running backs Brian Leonard and Cordera Eason-(C.E. subsequently released on waivers).

Green Bay Packers
On September 6, 2010, he was signed by the Green Bay Packers to their Practice Squad.

External links
Cincinnati Bengals bio
Kansas State Wildcats bio

References

1984 births
Living people
Players of American football from New Orleans
American football running backs
Blinn Buccaneers football players
Kansas State Wildcats football players
Cincinnati Bengals players
Minnesota Vikings players
Pittsburgh Steelers players
Green Bay Packers players